The South Church is a Protestant Christian place of worship located in Andover, Massachusetts.  It was organized as the Second Church of Andover in 1711 with Rev. Samuel Phillips as its first pastor.  It is currently part of the United Church of Christ.

History 

Until the early 18th century, one parish, known as "The Church of Andover" served the entire town.  Its church, or meeting house, was located in present day North Andover.  When it was found that the majority of the citizens lived in the southern part of the town (present day Andover), the idea was proposed to build a new meeting house there.  However, rather than one meeting house serve the entire town, it was agreed upon on November 2, 1708 that the town should have two meeting houses, one in the north and one in the south.  The North Parish (present day North Andover) kept the existing meeting house.  On October 18, 1709, the location of the new South Church was agreed upon and built "at ye Rock on the west side of Roger brook."  The meeting house was in use by January 1710.  Roger's Brook, named after a Native American named Roger who lived in Andover in the 17th century, once flowed by the South Church but has since been rerouted.  The rock referenced as "ye Rock" was a well known landmark known as Roger's Rock.  It was removed in 1844.  On October 17, 1711, the South Parish was officially established.   There were 35 original members, all but three of whom came from the North Parish.

Rev. Samuel Phillips began preaching at the church on April 30, 1710 but was not officially its pastor until the parish's founding on October 17, 1711.  He served for sixty years until his death on June 5, 1771.  He was survived by three children, Samuel, John, and William Phillips, all of whom contributed to the founding of Phillips Academy in 1788. The Samuel Phillips listed here should not be confused with Samuel Phillips Jr., his son and primary founder of the school.  John Phillips went on to found Phillips Exeter Academy in 1781.

A parsonage was built for the pastor of the church in 1709.  Rev. Phillips and Rev. French lived there until it was sold in 1811 after French's death.

Construction of a larger, new building took place in 1734.  On last Sabbath of worship in the old meeting house on May 12, 1734, Phillips preached from John 14:31 1.c. "Arise, let us go hence."  He preached the first sermon in the new meeting house on May 19.

Again in 1788 another meeting house (pictured above left) was built in a nearby location after receiving complaints of a long walk by members of the parish living west of the Shawsheen River.  Despite the complaints, the new meeting house remained east of the river, only about "six to eight rods" (1 rod = 16.5 feet) away from the meeting house of 1734.   During construction, the Trustees of Phillips Academy invited the parish to attend mass in their meeting hall up the hill.

On December 5, 1826, the West Parish Church was built for those west of the Shawsheen River under the same Confession of Faith and Covenant.  A total of 56 members of the South Church left to join the West Parish Church.

The current structure (pictured above right) was built in 1860 on the same spot as the meeting house of 1788 and dedicated on January 2, 1861. The church, a Romanesque Revival, was designed by John Stevens and cost about $19,000.

Today, according to the church's website, its mission is to be "a Christ-centered fellowship which celebrates the love of God."

Cemetery 

A cemetery adjacent to the church was established soon after the founding of the parish.  The first person to be buried there was Robert Russel in December 1710 however the earliest surviving inscription is on Mrs. Ann Blanchard's stone, who died on February 29, 1723.  Over time the cemetery grew through purchasing and receiving land from neighbors.

In the early 18th century it was custom for the bearers to carry the dead, often miles, from their place of death to the cemetery.  Funeral sermons were rarely given in the Parish.  Reverend Phillips introduced practices that gave bearers white and later purple gloves while carrying the coffin to the grave.  For his funeral in 1771, six clergyman wore rings as pallbearers.  All ordained ministers in attendance and those who gave gratis in the months leading to his death wore gloves.  These practices came to an end during the Revolutionary War.  At the time of the second pastor Johnathan French's death in 1809, the Church led the family in their mourning and draped the pulpit in black.  In addition, the Church ordered a Day of Fasting and Prayer in his honor.  In 1798 the church acquired their first hearse and in 1799 built a hearse house.

Several members of the Phillips family are buried in the cemetery including Reverend Samuel Phillips, his wife Hannah White, and Samuel Phillips Jr. (grandson), Lieutenant Governor of Massachusetts and primary founder of Phillips Academy.

List of pastors 

The following is a list of the pastors of the South Church from its establishment.  Note that Rev. Samuel Phillips, although officially ordained on October 17, 1711, had already been preaching at the church since 1710.  Also note that there were periods of time that the role was empty.  This list is incomplete due to a lack of available sources.  The current pastor is Rev. Dana Allen Walsh.

Gallery

Notes

References

See also 
 Central Street District

Bibliography

External links 
 South Church, Andover, MA: official website
 South Church Cemetery Search
 Andover Historical Preservation - South Church

Churches in Massachusetts
Andover, Massachusetts
Buildings and structures in Andover, Massachusetts
1711 establishments in Massachusetts